Martin Scherb (born 23 June 1969) is a retired Austrian football player and a football manager.

References

External links
 

1969 births
Living people
Austrian footballers
Austrian football managers
SKN St. Pölten managers
Association footballers not categorized by position
People from Sankt Pölten
Footballers from Lower Austria